Dorian Montserrat Hernández García (born 26 June 1999), known as Montserrat Hernández, is a Mexican footballer who plays as a midfielder for Liga MX Femenil club América and the Mexico women's national team.

Early life
Hernández was born in Zapotlán el Grande, Jalisco.

Club career
Hernández has played for América in Mexico.

International career
Hernández represented Mexico at two FIFA U-17 Women's World Cup editions (2014 and 2016) and the 2018 FIFA U-20 Women's World Cup.

Hernández made her debut for the senior Mexico women's national team on 20 February 2021, as a 76th-minute substitution in a 3–1 friendly home win over Costa Rica at Estadio Azteca in Mexico City.

References

External links 
 

1999 births
Living people
Footballers from Jalisco
Mexican women's footballers
Women's association football midfielders
Club América (women) footballers
Liga MX Femenil players
Mexico women's international footballers
20th-century Mexican women
21st-century Mexican women
Mexican footballers